Francis or Frances Stephens may refer to:

Francis Stephens (scientist), see List of Fellows of the Royal Society S,T,U,V
Frances Stephens (philanthropist) (1851–1915), Canadian of Scottish origin prominent in Montreal society
Frances Stephens (golfer) (1924–1978), English Curtis Cup player

See also

Frank Stephens (disambiguation)
Francis Stevens (disambiguation)
Francis Stephen, Holy Roman Emperor